Yvonne is a female given name. It is the feminine form of Yvon, which is derived from the French name Yves and Yvette. It is from the French word iv, meaning "yew" (or tree). Since yew wood was used for bows, Ivo may have been an occupational name meaning "archer". Yvonne/Ivonne is also a Spanish girl name.

This name first arrived in England with the Norman invasion, along with variations such as Yvette and male versions of the same name. It was the most popular of all of these names, but would fall out of favor. It was reintroduced into English-speaking countries in the early 20th century, when it was very popular. It is currently 173rd in the United States popular names list, but is an uncommon name in younger generations. It has also lost popularity in France, where in 1900 it was the 7th most popular name. It is a popular Protestant name in Northern Ireland.

Yvonne has several name days: May 26 in Sweden and December 11th in Ireland and Scotland.

People

This is a list of notable people with the first name Yvonne:
 Yvonne Andres, educator, e-learning pioneer and visionary.
 Yvonne Arnaud, French actress
 Yvonne Borree, New York City Ballet principal dancer
 Yvonne Brewster, Jamaican actress 
 Yvonne Bryceland, South African actress
 Yvonne Catterfeld (born 1979), German singer
 Yvonne Chaka Chaka, South African singer
 Yvonne Chouteau, Ballet dancer
 Yvonne Coghill, British public servant
 Yvonne Craig, American ballet dancer 
 Yvonne Cryns (b. 1951), American midwife and political activist
 Yvonne De Carlo (1922–2007), Canadian-American actress, The Munsters
 Yvonne Dionne (b. 1934), Canadian quintuplet
Yvonne Fovargue (born 1956), British politician
 Yvonne Ndege, British Journalist
 Yvonne Elkuch, Liechtensteiner cyclist
 Yvonne Elliman, 70s pop music artist
 Yvonne Hackenbroch (1912–2012), British museum curator and historian of jewellery
Yvonne Hayes Hinson, American politician
 Yvonne Hirdman, Swedish historian and gender researcher
 Yvonne Jacquette, American painter and printmaker
 Yvonne Kenny, Australian opera singer 
 Yvonne Lindsay, romance novelist from New Zealand 
 Yvonne Loriod (1924–2010), French pianist
 Yvonne Meusburger, Austrian tennis player
 Yvonne Minton, Australian opera singer
Yvonne Mosquito
Yvonne Mounsey
Yvonne McGregor
Yvonne O'Grady, British actress
 Yvonne Printemps, French actress
 Yvonne Rainer, American dancer
 Yvonne Ridley, British journalist
 Yvonne Nelson, Ghanaian actress 
 Yvonne Rust (1922 – 2002), New Zealand potter
 Yvonne Ryding, Miss Universe 1984
 Yvonne Stokes, Australian mathematician
 Yvonne Strahovski, Australian actress
 Yvonne Tobis (b. 1948), Israeli Olympic swimmer
 Yvonne van Gennip, Dutch Olympic speed skater
 Yvonne Thompson, British business leader

Fictional characters 

 Miss Yvonne, Pee-wee's Playhouse character
 Yvonne Atkins, character from the British drama series Bad Girls; portrayed by Linda Henry
 Yvonne Casey, character from the British soap opera, Coronation Street; portrayed by Yvonne O'Grady
 Yvonne Cotton, character from the British soap opera, EastEnders; portrayed by Pauline McLynn
 Yvonne Doyle (Fair City), character from the Irish soap opera Fair City; portrayed by Ciara O'Callaghan.
 Yvonne Jeffries, character from the New Zealand soap opera Shortland Street; portrayed by Alison Quigan
 Yvonne Teasley, Beverly Hills, 90210 character; portrayed by Denise Dowse

Variations 

 German language: Ivonne
 Dutch language: Ivo
 Italian language: Ivana
 Polish language: Iwona
 Portuguese language: Ivone
 Spanish language: Ivón, Ivona, Ivone.
 Greek language: Υβόννη (Yvonni)
 Latvian language: Ivonna
 Serbian language: Ивoна (Ivona)
 Macedonian language: Ивoна (Ivona)
 Croatian language: Ivona
 Irish language: Aoibheann, Aoibhinn
 Malaysian language: Eevon
 Slovene language: Ivona
 Romanian language: Ivona, Ivonn
 Czech language: Ivona, Yvona, Ivana

See also 
 Evonne
 Siobhan

References
 Names Database
 Behind the Name

Feminine given names
English feminine given names
French feminine given names
German feminine given names
Given names derived from plants or flowers
Dutch feminine given names
Norwegian feminine given names
Swedish feminine given names
Danish feminine given names